"Happy Days" is a song written by Norman Gimbel and Charles Fox. It is the theme of the 1970s television series Happy Days.  It can be heard during the TV show's opening and closing credits as it runs in perpetual rerun syndication.

"Happy Days" was first recorded in 1974 by Jim Haas with a group of other session singers for the first two seasons. These versions were used only during the closing credits of Seasons 1 and 2, with an updated take on "Rock Around the Clock" by Bill Haley and His Comets used as the opening theme. "Happy Days" was re-recorded by Pratt & McClain at ABC Recording Studios in Los Angeles in December 1975 with different lyrics for both the opening and closing credits for Seasons 3 through 10, with the duo including the song on their 1976 album Pratt & McClain Featuring Happy Days and releasing it as a single. Bobby Arvon recorded an updated version in 1983 for Season 11, with the same lyrics as the version used for seasons 3-10.

Pratt & McClain's album version of the song peaked at No. 5 on the Billboard Hot 100, No. 7 on the Easy Listening chart, and No. 31 on the UK Singles Chart.  In Canada, "Happy Days" reached No. 3.

Australian band Silver Studs did a rendition of the theme for their debut album. It became their biggest hit single in Australia, reaching No. 4 in June 1976.

In 2014, a re-recording of the song was used in commercials for Target. An instrumental version of the song plays in the background of some of the "Cooking with Sara" Flash games.

Personnel
Jerry McClain, Truett Pratt, and later Bobby Arvon (1983–84 TV only) – lead vocals
Charles Fox, Michael Ormartian – keyboards

Chart history

Weekly charts

Year-end charts

Silver Studs version
Australian group Silver Studs released a version in 1976.

Weekly charts

Year-end charts

See also
List of 1970s one-hit wonders in the United States

References

1974 songs
1976 singles
Happy Days
Reprise Records singles
Song recordings produced by Michael Omartian
Songs from television series
Songs with lyrics by Norman Gimbel
Songs with music by Charles Fox (composer)
Comedy television theme songs